Khodiyar railway station is a small railway station on the Western Railway network in the state of Gujarat, India. Khodiyar railway station is 11 km from Sabarmati Junction railway station. Passenger, MEMU and Express trains halt here.

Nearby stations 

 and {{rws|Sabarmati Junction}chandkheda road} are nearest railway stations towards , whereas Saij Sertha Road is nearest railway station towards .

Trains

 Gandhinagar Capital - Indore Shanti Express
14820 Sabarmati-jodhpur express
09431- sabarmati -mehsana aburoad demu
09433- sabarmati- patan demu daily

References

See also
 Ahmedabad district

Railway stations in Ahmedabad district
Ahmedabad railway division